N. M. Kelby (Nicole Mary Kelby) is an American short-story and novel writer.

Brought up in Florida, Kelby has worked as a reporter, editor and educator.  Initially a playwright, she later turned to novels and short stories. She is the author of Murder at the Bad Girl’s Bar and Grill, Whale Season, In the Company of Angels, and Theater of the Stars.

Her short stories have appeared in many publications including Zoetrope All-Story Extra, One Story, Minnesota Monthly, Verb, and The Mississippi Review. One was recorded by actress Joanne Woodward for the NPR CD Travel Tales, and included in New Stories from the South: Best of 2006.

Kelby took part in a month-long cultural exchange at Tyrone Guthrie Centre in County Monaghan, Ireland and will be the Artist-in-Residence at the Santa Fe Art Institute in May 2008.

Kelby is working on the movie version of Whale Season along with actor/singer/songwriter Dwight Yoakam.

N.M. Kelby's books have been reviewed in Entertainment Weekly, New York Times Book Review, San Francisco Chronicle, Minneapolis Star Tribune, Atlantic Monthly, Baltimore Sun, Publishers Weekly, New York Post, New York Times Sunday Book Review, Kirkus Reviews and The Philadelphia Inquirer.

Awards and honors
Kelby has been the recipient of a Bush Artist Fellowship in Literature, the Heekin Group Foundation's James Fellowship for the Novel, both a Florida and Minnesota State Arts Board Fellowship in fiction, two Jerome Travel Study Grants, and a Jewish Arts Endowment Fellowship. She was named "Outstanding Southern Artist" by The Southern Arts Federation and her work has been translated into several languages. She has been a Pirate's Alley Faulkner Award finalist for fiction three times and placed twice in the Nelson Algren Award for the Short Story.

Selected works
In the Company of Angels (2001,)
Theater of the stars: a novel of physics and memory (2003,) 
Whale Season: a novel (2006,)
Murder at the Bad Girl's Bar & Grill: a novel (2008,)
The constant art of being a writer : the life, art & business of fiction (2009,)
White Truffles in Winter (2011, W. W. Norton & Company) about Auguste Escoffier
The Pink Suit (2015,) about Jacqueline Kennedy

References

Sources
 Minneapolis Star Tribune interview
 N. M. Kelby resume
 N.M. Kelby Bio

External links

Living people
Year of birth missing (living people)
21st-century American novelists
American dramatists and playwrights
Novelists from Florida
American women novelists
21st-century American women writers
21st-century American short story writers